Aleksei Vladimirovich Bakunin (born 18 November 1970) is a Russian former professional footballer.

Playing career
He made his professional debut in the Russian Third League in 1994 for FC Uralmash-d Yekaterinburg. He played 5 games in the UEFA Intertoto Cup 1996 for FC Uralmash Yekaterinburg.

References

1970 births
Sportspeople from Yekaterinburg
Living people
Russian footballers
Association football defenders
Russian Premier League players
FC Ural Yekaterinburg players